The Cupriavidus-1 RNA motif is a conserved RNA structure that was discovered by bioinformatics.
Cupriavidus-1 motifs are found in Betaproteobacteria, within Cupriavidus.

It is ambiguous whether Cupriavidus-1 RNAs function as cis-regulatory elements or whether they operate in trans.  In some cases they are located between genes encode subunits of ATP synthase, but there are too few Cupriavidus-1 RNAs that are known in order to determine whether this association has biological significance.

References

Non-coding RNA